Elections were held in Illinois on Tuesday, November 3, 1998. Primary elections were held on March 17, 1998.

These elections saw Democrats make gains. The Democratic Party went from holding no statewide offices, to holding two.

Election information
1998 was a midterm election year in the United States.

Turnout

Primary election
For the primary election, turnout was 27.04%, with 1,824,806 votes cast. 

Turnout by county

General election
For the general election, turnout was 52.43%, with 3,541,379 votes cast.

Turnout by county

Federal elections

United States Senate 

Incumbent Democratic United States Senator Carol Moseley Braun lost reelection, being unseated by Republican Peter Fitzgerald.

United States House 

All 20 of Illinois' seats in the United States House of Representatives were up for election in 1998.

No seats switched parties, leaving the composition of Illinois' House delegation 10 Democrats and 10 Republicans.

State elections

Governor and Lieutenant Governor

Incumbent Governor Jim Edgar, a Republican, did not seek a third term. Republican George Ryan was elected to succeed him.

Attorney General 

Incumbent Attorney General Jim Ryan, a Republican, was reelected to a second term.  this is the last time a Republican was elected Illinois Attorney General.

Democratic primary

Republican primary

Reform primary

General election

Secretary of State 

Incumbent Secretary of State George Ryan, a Republican, did not seek reelection to a third term in office, instead opting to run for Governor. Democrat Jesse White was elected to succeed him in office.

Democratic primary

Republican primary

Reform primary

General election

Comptroller 

Incumbent Comptroller Loleta Didrickson, a Republican, did not seek reelection to a second term, instead opting to (ultimately unsuccessfully) run for the Republican nomination for United States Senate. Democrat Daniel Hynes was elected to succeed her in office.

Democratic primary

Republican primary

Reform primary

General election

Treasurer 

Incumbent Treasurer Judy Baar Topinka, a Republican, was reelected to a second term.

Democratic primary
Orland Park mayor Daniel J. McLaughlin defeated Calumet City Jerry Genova.

Republican primary

Reform primary

General election

State Senate
Some of the seats of the Illinois Senate were up for election in 1998. Republicans retained control of the chamber.

State House of Representatives
All of the seats in the Illinois House of Representatives were up for election in 1998. Democrats retained control of the chamber.

Judicial elections
Multiple judicial positions were up for election in 1998.

Ballot measure
Illinois voters voted on a single ballot measure in 1998. In order to be approved, the measures required either 60% support among those specifically voting on the amendment or 50% support among all ballots cast in the elections.

Illinois Courts Commission Amendment
Voters approved the Illinois Courts Commission Amendment, a legislatively referred constitutional amendment which amended Article VI, Section 15 of the Constitution of Illinois to make modifications to the courts commission.

Local elections
Local elections were held. These included county elections, such as the Cook County elections.

Notes

References

 
Illinois